Naule Katuwal is a village and market center Dullu Municipality in Dailekh District in the Bheri Zone of western-central Nepal. The formerly village development committee was annexed to the municipality from 18 May 2014. At the time of the 1991 Nepal census it had a population of 2935 people living in 591 individual households.

References

External links
UN map of the municipalities of Dailekh District

Populated places in Dailekh District